Plain Township is one of the seventeen townships of Franklin County, Ohio, United States. As of the 2010 census the population was 9,829, up from 5,926 at the 2000 census. 2,128 of the residents lived in the unincorporated portions of the township in 2010.

Geography

Located in the northeastern corner of the county, it consists of a large section in the north and east and several small "islands" in the southwest.  While the islands are surrounded by the city of Columbus, the large section borders the following townships and cities:
Harlem Township, Delaware County - north
Monroe Township, Licking County - northeast corner
Jersey Township, Licking County - east
Pataskala - southeast corner
Jefferson Township - south
Columbus - southwest
Blendon Township - west
Genoa Township, Delaware County - northwest corner

Two municipalities are located in Plain Township:
Part of the city of Columbus, in the southwest
The city of New Albany, in the center

The northern part of Plain Township is situated in the headwaters of the Rocky Fork Creek, a tributary of the Big Walnut Creek.  From north to south, the Fancher Run, Schleppi Run, Bevelheimer Run, and Sugar Run of the Rocky Fork Creek wind through the township.  Blacklick Creek runs from the northeast part of the township, south through New Albany, and on to the southeast section of the township.

Name and history

Statewide, other Plain Townships are located in Stark, Wayne, and Wood counties.

Plain Township was organized in 1810.

In 1970 Plain Township stretched , with the only exception to its being a full  being the fairly small town of New Albany. The south-central part of the township has since mainly become part of New Albany, while the southwest has been annexed by Columbus.

Government
The township is governed by a three-member board of trustees, who are elected in November of odd-numbered years to a four-year term beginning on the following January 1. Two are elected in the year after the presidential election and one is elected in the year before it. There is also an elected township fiscal officer, who serves a four-year term beginning on April 1 of the year after the election, which is held in November of the year before the presidential election. Vacancies in the fiscal officership or on the board of trustees are filled by the remaining trustees.

References

External links
Plain Township official website
County website

Townships in Franklin County, Ohio
Townships in Ohio